Ladies of the Big House is a 1931 American pre-Code drama film directed by Marion Gering and written by Ernest Booth, William Slavens McNutt and Grover Jones. The film stars Sylvia Sidney, Gene Raymond, Wynne Gibson, Earle Foxe, Rockliffe Fellowes, Purnell Pratt and Frank Sheridan. The film was released on December 26, 1931, by Paramount Pictures.

Plot
Young florist Kathleen Storm (Sylvia Sidney) is instantly the object of desire of a young man standing in front of the shopwindow, where she is arranging flowers. They have two wonderful weeks in their life together before they marry. The same day her criminal ex-boyfriend Kid Athens (Earle Foxe), who heard about her wedding, decides to frame her and her new husband. She and her husband Standish (Gene Raymond) end up in prison. He is sentenced to death penalty on a charge of murder and she to a life sentence. In prison she meets a woman, Susie Thompson (Wynne Gibson), who was Kid Athens' girlfriend before her, who after an initial raging jealousy ends up helping her to tell the authorities the truth about Kid Athens and she and her husband's innocence. Justice wins and the couple can finally have a honeymoon on a ship.

Cast 
Sylvia Sidney as Kathleen Storm McNeil
Gene Raymond as Standish McNeil
Wynne Gibson as Susie Thompson
Earle Foxe as Kid Athens
Rockliffe Fellowes as Martin Doremus
Purnell Pratt as John Hartman
Frank Sheridan as Warden Hecker
Louise Beavers as Ivory
Miriam Goldina as Maria 
Hilda Vaughn as Millie
Fritzi Ridgeway as Reno Maggie
Esther Howard as Clara Newman
Edna Bennett as The Countess 
Ruth Lyons as Gertie
Jane Darwell as Mrs. Turner
Mary Foy as Mrs. Lowry
Noel Francis as Thelma
Theodore von Eltz as Frazer
Evelyn Preer as Inmate

See also
The House That Shadows Built (1931) Paramount promotional film with excerpts of Ladies of the Big House

References

External links 
 

1931 films
1931 drama films
1930s prison films
American black-and-white films
American prison drama films
Films directed by Marion Gering
Paramount Pictures films
Women in prison films
1930s English-language films
1930s American films